Connected component may refer to:

Connected component (graph theory), a set of vertices in a graph that are linked to each other by paths
Connected component (topology), a maximal subset of a topological space that cannot be covered by the union of two disjoint open sets

See also
Connected-component labeling, an algorithm for finding contiguous subsets of pixels in a digital image